Martin v. Herzog, Ct. of App. of N.Y., 228 N Y. 164, 126 N.E. 814 (1920), was a New York Court of Appeals case.

Facts
Martin (P) appealed the order of the Appellate Division that reversed a judgment entered after jury trial that found Herzog (D) negligent and P blameless.

Martin (P) was driving his buggy on the night of August 21, 1915. P was killed in a collision between his buggy and Herzog's (D) car. It was dark when the accident occurred. P was driving without lights and D did not keep to the right of the center of the highway. P alleged that D was driving on the wrong side of the road.  D claimed that P was contributorily negligent for driving without headlights as required under the law. In the body of the charge the trial judge said that the jury could consider the absence of light "in determining whether the plaintiff's intestate was guilty of contributory negligence in failing to have a light upon the buggy as provided by law. I do not mean to say that the absence of light necessarily makes him negligent, but it is a fact for your consideration." D requested a ruling that the absence of a light on the plaintiff's vehicle was "prima facie evidence of contributory negligence." This request was refused, and the jury were again instructed that they might consider the absence of lights as some evidence of negligence, but that it was not conclusive evidence. P then requested a charge that "the fact that the plaintiff's intestate was driving without a light is not negligence in itself," and to this the court acceded. The jury was instructed that they were at liberty to treat the omission of the lights either as innocent or as culpable. The jury gave the verdict to P. The Appellate Division reversed that verdict. P appealed to the Court of Appeals.

Issue
Does a jury have the power to relax the duty that one traveler on the highway owes under a statute to another on the same highway? Is negligent conduct actionable by itself unless there is a showing that such conduct was the cause of the injuries incurred?

Rule of law
The unexcused violation of a statutory duty is negligence per se and a jury does not have the power to relax the duty that one traveler on the highway owes under a statute to another on the same highway. Negligent conduct is not actionable by itself unless there is a showing that such conduct was the cause of the injuries incurred.

Holding and decision
Judge Benjamin N. Cardozo gave the following judgment.

Dissent
Judge John W. Hogan read the following.

Legal analysis of Martin v. Herzog
Martin v. Herzog demonstrates the following principles of tort law:

1. Violation of a statute is negligence per se.

2. Under the doctrine of contributory negligence, the plaintiff's negligence is a complete defense.  If the plaintiff's negligence was a cause of the injury, the plaintiff is barred from recovery.

In an opinion written by Benjamin N. Cardozo, the New York Court of Appeals affirmed the Appellate Division's ruling that the trial judge's jury instruction was erroneous.  The trial judge had instructed the jury to consider the plaintiff's statutory violation when determining whether the plaintiff was contributorily negligent.  The Court of Appeals held that the question of contributory negligence should not have been submitted to the jury.  The plaintiff's violation of the statute was not mere evidence of negligence to be considered by the fact-finder; it was negligence as a matter of law.

The statute requiring highway travelers to have headlights codified the common law duty of one highway traveler to another.  In failing to have headlights on his buggy, the plaintiff's intestate breached a duty of care to other highway travelers.  (Cf. Tedla v. Ellman, where the plaintiffs' violation of a statute was not negligent because, in their particular situation, violating the statute was safer than adhering to it.)  If a plaintiff's negligence per se is to be contributory negligence, it must be a cause of the injury.  In Martin v. Herzog, the Court of Appeals found the plaintiff's traveling without lights an hour after sundown to be prima facie sufficient evidence of negligence contributing to the accident.

Causation issues
A dissenting opinion by John W. Hogan countered that the plaintiff's negligence was not a contributing cause of the accident because the defendant was driving on the wrong side of the road.  The dissenting opinion sets out the jury's findings of fact, which were affirmed by the Appellate Division:  (A) the defendant was driving his car on the wrong side of the road; (B) the plaintiff's intestate was driving his buggy to the extreme right of the road; and (C) the highway was well lighted, such that witnesses could see the body of the plaintiff's intestate from forty feet away.

See also
US tort law

United States tort case law
New York (state) state case law
1920 in United States case law
1920 in New York (state)
Negligence case law
United States transportation law